Route 316 is a collector road in the Canadian province of Nova Scotia. It is located in Antigonish County and Guysborough County, connecting Lower South River at Highway 104 with Half Island Cove at Trunk 16.

Communities
Half Island Cove
Upper Whitehead
Port Felix East
Port Felix
Charlos Cove
Larry's River
New Harbour West
Coddle's Harbour
Drumhead
Seal Harbour
Goldboro
Isaac's Harbour North
Stormont
Middle Country Harbour
Country Harbour Mines
Cross Roads Country Harbour
Country Harbour Lake
Fisher Mills
Eight Island Lake
Goshen
Argyle
Loch Katrine
Upper South River
Frasers Mills
St. Andrews
Lower South River

See also
List of Nova Scotia provincial highways

References

Nova Scotia provincial highways
Roads in Antigonish County, Nova Scotia
Roads in Guysborough County, Nova Scotia